Choreti Airport is an airstrip  northeast of Santa Ana del Yacuma in the pampa of the Beni Department in Bolivia.

See also

Transport in Bolivia
List of airports in Bolivia

References

External links 
OpenStreetMap - Choreti
OurAirports - Choreti
Fallingrain - Choreti Airport
HERE/Nokia Maps - Choreti

Airports in Beni Department